This is a List of the Roman and Eastern Catholic dioceses in Oceania.
 
Because Oceania is one of the more sparsely populated areas of the world, the majority of its dioceses are located in Australia and New Zealand, although they range as far as the Midway Atoll in the Pacific Ocean to Tasmania.

Episcopal Conference of Australia

Exempt, i.e. immediately subject to the Holy See 
 Archdiocese of Canberra and Goulburn, covering the federal district Canberra and adjacent part of New South Wales
 Archdiocese of Hobart, covering Tasmania
 Military Ordinariate of Australia, for the armed forces
 Personal Ordinariate of Our Lady of the Southern Cross, with see in Maylands, Western Australia (for former Anglicans in Australia and Japan)

Ecclesiastical Province of Adelaide
 Metropolitan Archdiocese of Adelaide, in South Australia
 Diocese of Darwin, covering the Northern Territory
 Diocese of Point Pirie, in South Australia

Ecclesiastical Province of Brisbane
(covering Queensland)
Metropolitan Archdiocese of Brisbane
Diocese of Cairns
Diocese of Rockhampton
Diocese of Toowoomba
Diocese of Townsville

Ecclesiastical Province of Melbourne
(covering Victoria state)
Metropolitan Archdiocese of Melbourne
Diocese of Ballarat
Diocese of Sale
Diocese of Sandhurst
Ukrainian Catholic Diocese of Saints Peter and Paul of Melbourne (Ukrainian Catholic Church Byzantine Rite Eparchy (Diocese), with cathedral see in North Melbourne, Victoria, Australia; also covers New Zealand and Oceania

Ecclesiastical Province of Perth
(covering Western Australia)
Metropolitan Archdiocese of Perth, also covers Christmas Island, Cocos Islands, Heard Island and McDonald Islands
Diocese of Broome
Diocese of Bunbury
Diocese of Geraldton

Ecclesiastical Province of Sydney
(most of New South Wales)
Metropolitan Archdiocese of Sydney, also covers Norfolk Island 
Diocese of Armidale
Diocese of Bathurst
Diocese of Broken Bay
Diocese of Lismore
Diocese of Maitland-Newcastle
Diocese of Parramatta
Diocese of Wagga Wagga
Diocese of Wilcannia-Forbes
Diocese of Wollongong

Other Eastern dioceses
 Maronite Diocese of Saint Maron of Sydney, with cathedral see in Redfern, New South Wales; immediately subject to the Maronite Patriarch of Antioch (in Lebanon; Antiochian Rite)
 Greek-Melkite Diocese of Saint Michael’s of Sydney, with cathedral see in Darlington, New South Wales; also covers New Zealand; immediately subject to the Melkite Patriarch of Antioch (in Syria; a Byzantine Rite)
 Syro-Malabar Diocese of Saint Thomas the Apostle of Melbourne, with cathedral see in Melbourne, Victoria; immediately subject to the Major Archbishop of Ernakulam–Angamaly (in India; a Syro-Oriental Rite)
 Chaldean Catholic Eparchy of Saint Thomas the Apostle of Sydney, with cathedral see at Bossley Park, New South Wales; also covers New Zealand; immediately subject to the Chaldean Catholic Patriarch of Babylon (in Iraq; Chaldean Rite, also Syro-Oriental)

Episcopal Conference of New Zealand
See Australia for the Chaldean Catholic, Melkite and Ukrainian Catholic dioceses competent for both countries, with sees in Sydney, Sydney viz. Melbourne
 cfr. infra Episcopal Conference of the [South] Pacific for three New Zealand island dependencies, notably the diocese of Raratonga (on the Cook Islands, also covering Niue) and the Mission Sui Iuris of Tokelau, both suffragans of the Metropolitan Archbishop of Suva

Exempt, i.e. Immediately subject to the Holy See
 Military Ordinariate of New Zealand, for the armed forces

Ecclesiastical Province of Wellington
Metropolitan Archdiocese of Wellington
Diocese of Auckland
Diocese of Christchurch
Diocese of Dunedin
Diocese of Hamilton in New Zealand
Diocese of Palmerston North

Episcopal Conference of the Pacific

Note 1: For the Ukrainian Catholics, see Australia, under Melbourne.
Note 2: The United States Minor Outlying Islands (U.S. Minor Islands) – such as Wake, Midway, Johnston, which are Unincorporated Territories of USA – are administered by the Archdiocese for the Military Services of the United States at Washington, D.C.
Note 3: Honolulu (on and for Hawaii) is a suffragan diocese in the ecclesiastical Province of San Francisco (California, USA).

Exempt, i.e., immediately subject to the Holy See
 Diocese of Tonga

Ecclesiastical Province of Agaña
Metropolitan Archdiocese of Agaña
Diocese of Caroline Islands
Diocese of Chalan Kanoa
Prefecture of the Marshall Islands

Ecclesiastical Province of Nouméa
Metropolitan Archdiocese of Nouméa
Diocese of Port-Vila
Diocese of Wallis et Futuna

Ecclesiastical Province of Papeete
Metropolitan Archdiocese of Papeete
Diocese of Taiohae o Tefenuaenata

Ecclesiastical Province of Samoa-Apia
Archdiocese of Samoa-Apia
Diocese of Samoa-Pago Pago
Mission Sui Iuris of Funafuti
Mission Sui Iuris of Tokelau

Ecclesiastical Province of Suva
Metropolitan Archdiocese of Suva
Diocese of Rarotonga
Diocese of Tarawa and Nauru

Episcopal Conference of Papua New Guinea

Ecclesiastical Province of Madang
Metropolitan Metropolitan Archdiocese of Madang
Diocese of Aitape
Diocese of Lae
Diocese of Vanimo
Diocese of Wewak

Ecclesiastical Province of Mount Hagen
Metropolitan Archdiocese of Mount Hagen
Diocese of Goroka
Diocese of Kundiawa
Diocese of Mendi
Diocese of Wabag

Ecclesiastical Province of Port Moresby
Metropolitan Archdiocese of Port Moresby
Diocese of Alotau-Sideia
Diocese of Bereina
Diocese of Daru-Kiunga
Diocese of Kerema

Ecclesiastical Province of Rabaul
 Metropolitan Archdiocese of Rabaul
 Diocese of Bougainville
 Diocese of Kavieng
 Diocese of Kimbe

Episcopal Conference of the Solomon Islands

Ecclesiastical Province of Honaira
 Metropolitan Archdiocese of Honiara
 Diocese of Auki
 Diocese of Gizo

See also 

 List of Catholic dioceses (structured view)
 List of Catholic dioceses (alphabetical)

External links 
 GigaCatholic

Oceania religion-related lists

Oceania